IC 418, also known as Spirograph Nebula, is a planetary nebula located in the constellation of Lepus about 3,600 ly away. It spans 0.3 light-years across.

The name derives from the intricate pattern of the nebula, which resembles a pattern which can be created using the Spirograph, a toy that produces geometric patterns (specifically, hypotrochoids and epitrochoids) on paper.

The central star of the planetary nebula, HD 35914, is an O-type star with a spectral type of O7fp.

References

External links

The Spirograph Nebula (IC 418) - STScI Press Release
Astronomy Picture of the Day - IC 418: The Spirograph Nebula - 2010 April 11

IC 0418
IC 0418
0418
O-type stars